Soul Sister is an album by organist Shirley Scott recorded in 1960 and released on the Prestige label in 1966.

Reception
The Allmusic review stated "The one thing that makes this 1960 session stand out from much of Scott's other work is the prominence of Lem Winchester's vibes as the chief counterpoint to her organ".

Track listing 
 "On Green Dolphin Street" (Bronislaw Kaper, Ned Washington) - 4:11  
 "Blues for Tyrone" (Shirley Scott) - 9:47  
 "Sonnymoon for Two" (Sonny Rollins) - 4:01  
 "Like Young" (André Previn) - 6:39  
 "The More I See You" (Mack Gordon, Harry Warren) - 6:21  
 "Get Me to the Church on Time" (Alan Jay Lerner Frederick Loewe) - 4:37

Personnel 
 Shirley Scott - organ
 Lem Winchester - vibraphone 
 George Duvivier - bass
 Arthur Edgehill - drums

References 

1966 albums
Albums produced by Esmond Edwards
Albums recorded at Van Gelder Studio
Prestige Records albums
Shirley Scott albums